Cyathea is a genus of tree ferns, the type genus of the fern order Cyatheales.

The genus name Cyathea is derived from the Greek kyatheion, meaning "little cup", and refers to the cup-shaped sori on the underside of the fronds.

Description
The species of Cyathea are mostly terrestrial ferns, usually with a single tall stem. Rarely, the trunk may be branched or creeping. Many species also develop a fibrous mass of roots at the base of the trunk.

The genus has a pantropical distribution, with over 470 species. They grow in habitats ranging from tropical rain forests to temperate woodlands.

Classification
Conant et al. in 1996, concluded on molecular cpDNA and morphological evidence that a system of three clades – Alsophila, Cyathea and Sphaeropteris was the most accurate reflection of evolutionary lineages within the Cyatheaceae, Alsophila being the most basal and Cyathea and Sphaeropteris derived sister groups. In the Pteridophyte Phylogeny Group classification of 2016 (PPG I), these are accepted as separate genera, Alsophila, Cyathea and Sphaeropteris. Cnemidaria Presl, 1836 is a junior synonym or redundant subset.

Species
, World Ferns (Version 12.3) accepted the following species:

Cyathea abbreviata I.Fernald
Cyathea abrapatriciana Lehnert & A.Tejedor
Cyathea acantha (Sehnem) Lehnert
Cyathea acutidens (Christ) Domin
Cyathea aemula Lehnert
Cyathea affinis (G.Forst.) Sw.
Cyathea akawaiorum P.J.Edwards
Cyathea alata (E.Fourn.) Copel.
Cyathea alatissima (Stolze) Lehnert
Cyathea alfonsiana L.D.Gómez
Cyathea alsophiloides S.Maciel & Lehnert
Cyathea alstonii R.M.Tryon
Cyathea amabilis (C.V.Morton) Lehnert
Cyathea andaquiensis Lehnert, F.Giraldo & W.Rodríguez
Cyathea andicola Domin
Cyathea andina (H.Karst.) Domin
Cyathea angelica A.Tejedor & G.Calat.
Cyathea antioquensis A.Rojas
Cyathea arborea (L.) Sm.
Cyathea aristata Domin
Cyathea armata (Sw.) Domin
Cyathea arnecornelii Lehnert
Cyathea ars Lehnert
Cyathea aspera (L.) Sw.
Cyathea asplenioides (A.C.Sm.) Christenh.
Cyathea assurgens R.M.Tryon
Cyathea atahuallpa (R.M.Tryon) Lellinger
Cyathea aterrima (Hook.) Domin
Cyathea atrocastanea Labiak & F.B.Matos
Cyathea atrovirens (Langsd. & Fisch.) Domin
Cyathea aurea Klotzsch
Cyathea austroamericana Domin
Cyathea austropallescens Lehnert
Cyathea axillaris (Raddi) Lellinger
Cyathea azuayensis Sodiro
Cyathea barringtonii A.R.Sm. ex Lellinger
Cyathea bella (Rchb.fil. ex Mett.) Domin
Cyathea bettinae Lehnert
Cyathea bicrenata Liebm.
Cyathea biliranensis Copel.
Cyathea bipinnata (R.M.Tryon) R.C.Moran
Cyathea bipinnatifida (Baker) Domin
Cyathea boconensis H.Karst.
Cyathea borinquena (Maxon) Domin
Cyathea boryana (Kuhn) Domin
Cyathea bradei (P.G.Windisch) Lellinger
Cyathea brucei Lehnert
Cyathea brunnescens (Barrington) R.C.Moran
Cyathea calamitatis Lehnert
Cyathea callejasii Lehnert, F.Giraldo & A.Tejedor
Cyathea caracasana (Klotzsch) Domin
Cyathea cardenasii Lehnert, F.Giraldo & W.Rodríguez
Cyathea carolihenrici Lehnert
Cyathea carolinae A.Tejedor & G.Calat.
Cyathea catacampta Alston
Cyathea catenata Lehnert, F.Giraldo & W.Rodríguez
Cyathea cervantesiana A.Rojas
Cyathea chimaera Lehnert & A.Tejedor
Cyathea chimborazensis (Hook.) Hieron.
Cyathea chiricana (Maxon) Domin
Cyathea chocoensis (Stolze) Lehnert
Cyathea chontilla Lehnert
Cyathea choricarpa (Maxon) Domin
Cyathea cicatricosa Holttum
Cyathea cisandina A.Tejedor & G.Calat.
Cyathea clandestina Lehnert, F.Giraldo & A.Tejedor
Cyathea cnemidaria Lehnert
Cyathea cocleana (Stolze) Lehnert
Cyathea coloradoana Lehnert, F.Giraldo & W.Rodríguez
Cyathea concinna (Baker) Jenman
Cyathea concordia B.León & R.C.Moran
Cyathea conformis (R.M.Tryon) Stolze
Cyathea conjugata (Spruce ex Hook.) Domin
Cyathea conquisita Jenman
Cyathea consimilis (Stolze) Lehnert
Cyathea convergens Lehnert
Cyathea corallifera Sodiro
Cyathea corcovadensis (Raddi) Domin
Cyathea costaricensis (Mett. ex Kuhn) Domin
Cyathea croftii Holttum
Cyathea cruciata (Desv.) Lehnert
Cyathea ctenitoides (Lellinger) Christenh.
Cyathea cumingii Baker
Cyathea cyatheoides (Desv.) K.U.Kramer
Cyathea cyclodium (R.M.Tryon) Lellinger
Cyathea cylindrica S.Maciel & Lehnert
Cyathea cystolepis Sodiro
Cyathea darienensis R.C.Moran
Cyathea decomposita (H.Karst.) Domin
Cyathea decorata (Maxon) R.M.Tryon
Cyathea decurrens (Hook.) Copel.
Cyathea decurrentiloba Domin
Cyathea dejecta (Baker) Christenh.
Cyathea delgadii Pohl ex Sternb.
Cyathea demissa (C.V.Morton) A.R.Sm. ex Lellinger
Cyathea diabolica Lehnert
Cyathea dichromatolepis (Fée) Domin
Cyathea dintelmannii Lehnert
Cyathea dissimilis (C.V.Morton) Stolze
Cyathea dissoluta Baker
Cyathea divergens Kunze
Cyathea dombeyi (Desv.) Lellinger
Cyathea dudleyi R.M.Tryon
Cyathea dyeri Sodiro
Cyathea ebenina H.Karst.
Cyathea eggersii Hieron.
Cyathea elliottii Domin
Cyathea epaleata (Holttum) Holttum
Cyathea estelae (Riba) Proctor
Cyathea estevesorum A.Tejedor & G.Calat.
Cyathea ewanii Alston
Cyathea falcata (Mett. ex Kuhn) Domin
Cyathea feeana (C.Chr.) Domin
Cyathea flava (R.M.Tryon) Christenh.
Cyathea frigida (H.Karst.) Domin
Cyathea fulva (M.Martens & Galeotti) Fée
Cyathea gibbosa (Klotzsch) Domin
Cyathea giraldoi A.Tejedor, G.Calat., Lehnert, W.D.Rodr. & M.Kessler
Cyathea glandulifera Lehnert
Cyathea glaziovii Domin
Cyathea godmanii (Hook.) Domin
Cyathea gracilis Griseb.
Cyathea grandifolia Willd.
Cyathea grantii Copel.
Cyathea grata Domin
Cyathea gratissima A.Tejedor & G.Calat.
Cyathea grayumii A.Rojas
Cyathea guentheriana Lehnert
Cyathea harrisii Underw.
Cyathea haughtii (Maxon) R.M.Tryon
Cyathea hemiepiphytica R.C.Moran
Cyathea herzogii Rosenst.
Cyathea hierbabuena A.Tejedor & G.Calat.
Cyathea hirsuta C.Presl
Cyathea hirsutissima (Fée) Domin
Cyathea hodgeana Proctor
Cyathea holdridgeana Nisman & L.D.Gómez
Cyathea horrida (L.) Sm.
Cyathea howeana Domin
Cyathea hymenophylloides (L.D.Gómez) Christenh.
Cyathea iheringii (Rosenst.) Domin
Cyathea impar R.M.Tryon
Cyathea incognita (Lellinger) Christenh.
Cyathea indefinita S.Maciel & J.Prado
Cyathea jacobsii Holttum
Cyathea jamaicensis Jenman
Cyathea kalbreyeri (Baker) Domin
Cyathea karsteniana (Klotzsch) Domin
Cyathea kessleriana Lehnert, F.Giraldo & A.Tejedor
Cyathea lasiosora (Mett. ex Kuhn) Domin
Cyathea latevagans (Baker) Domin
Cyathea lechleri Mett.
Cyathea lehnertii A.Tejedor & G.Calat.
Cyathea lellingeriana S.Maciel & J.Prado
Cyathea leoniae M.E.Acuña & Huamán
Cyathea leucofolis Domin
Cyathea leucolepismata Alston
Cyathea liesneri A.R.Sm.
Cyathea lindeniana C.Presl
Cyathea lindigii (Baker) Domin
Cyathea longipetiolulata A.Rojas & A.Tejedor
Cyathea macrocarpa (C.Presl) Domin
Cyathea macrosora (Baker) Domin
Cyathea margarita Lehnert
Cyathea marginalis (Klotzsch) Domin
Cyathea mexiae Copel.
Cyathea microdonta (Desv.) Domin
Cyathea microphylla Mett.
Cyathea microphyllodes Domin
Cyathea miersii (Hook.) Domin
Cyathea minima S.Maciel & J.Prado
Cyathea minuta J.Murillo & M.T.Murillo
Cyathea monteagudoi A.Tejedor & G.Calat.
Cyathea moranii Lehnert
Cyathea mucilagina R.C.Moran
Cyathea multiflora Sm.
Cyathea multisegmenta R.M.Tryon
Cyathea mutica (Christ) Domin
Cyathea myriotricha (Baker) R.C.Moran & J.Prado
Cyathea nanna (Barrington) Lellinger
Cyathea neblinae A.R.Sm.
Cyathea nephele Lehnert
Cyathea nervosa (Maxon) Lehnert
Cyathea nesiotica (Maxon) Domin
Cyathea nigripes (C.Presl) Domin
Cyathea nodulifera R.C.Moran
Cyathea notabilis Domin
Cyathea novoi A.Tejedor & G.Calat.
Cyathea oblonga (Klotzsch) Domin
Cyathea obnoxia Lehnert
Cyathea obtusa (Kaulf.) Domin
Cyathea oreopteroides Lehnert & A.Tejedor
Cyathea oscarorum A.Tejedor & G.Calat.
Cyathea pacis F.Giraldo, W.Rodríguez & A.Tejedor
Cyathea palaciosii R.C.Moran
Cyathea pallescens (Sodiro) Domin
Cyathea parvifolia Sodiro
Cyathea parvula (Jenman) Proctor
Cyathea patens hort. ex Houlston & Moore
Cyathea pauciflora (Kuhn) Lellinger
Cyathea paucifolia (Baker) Domin
Cyathea peladensis (Hieron.) Domin
Cyathea pendula Jenman
Cyathea petiolata (Hook.) R.M.Tryon
Cyathea phalaenolepis (C.Chr.) Domin Domin
Cyathea phalerata Mart.
Cyathea phegopteroides (Hook.) Domin
Cyathea phoenix A.Tejedor & G.Calat.
Cyathea pholidota Lehnert, F.Giraldo & A.Tejedor
Cyathea pibyae A.Tejedor & G.Calat.
Cyathea pilosissima (Baker) Domin
Cyathea pilozana M.T. & J.Murillo
Cyathea pinnula (Christ) R.C.Moran
Cyathea planadae Arens & A.R.Sm.
Cyathea platylepis (Hook.) Domin
Cyathea plicata Lehnert
Cyathea poeppigii (Hook.) Domin
Cyathea polliculi Lehnert
Cyathea povedae A.Rojas
Cyathea praeceps A.R.Sm.
Cyathea praecincta (Kunze) Domin
Cyathea praetermissa Lehnert
Cyathea pseudoctenitoides S.Maciel & J.Prado
Cyathea pseudonanna (L.D.Gómez) Lellinger
Cyathea puberula Sodiro
Cyathea punctata R.C.Moran & B.Øllg.
Cyathea pungens (Willd.) Domin
Cyathea recondita A.Tejedor & G.Calat.
Cyathea rengifoi Lehnert, F.Giraldo & A.Tejedor
Cyathea retanae A.Rojas
Cyathea robertsiana (F.Muell.) Domin
Cyathea rocioae A.Tejedor & G.Calat.
Cyathea rodriguezii Lehnert & F.Giraldo
Cyathea rojasiana Lehnert
Cyathea roraimensis (Domin) Domin
Cyathea rufa (Fée) Lellinger
Cyathea rufescens (Mett. ex Kuhn) Domin
Cyathea ruiziana Klotzsch
Cyathea ruttenbergiae A.Tejedor & F.Areces
Cyathea sagittifolia (Hook.) Domin
Cyathea scabra Baker
Cyathea schiedeana (C.Presl) Domin
Cyathea schlimii (Kuhn) Domin
Cyathea serpens (R.M.Tryon) Lehnert
Cyathea setchellii Copel.
Cyathea simplex R.M.Tryon
Cyathea singularis (Stolze) Lehnert
Cyathea sipapoensis (R.M.Tryon) Lellinger
Cyathea sledgei Ranil, Pushpak. & Fraser-Jenk.
Cyathea speciosa Humb. & Bonpl. ex Willd.
Cyathea spectabilis (Kunze) Domin
Cyathea squamata (Klotzsch) Domin
Cyathea squamipes H.Karst
Cyathea squamulosa (Losch) R.C.Moran
Cyathea squarrosa (Rosenst.) Domin
Cyathea srilankensis Ranil
Cyathea steyermarkii R.M.Tryon
Cyathea stokesii (E.D.Br.) N.Hallé & Florence
Cyathea stolzeana (L.D.Gómez) Lehnert
Cyathea stolzei A.R.Sm. ex Lellinger
Cyathea straminea H.Karst.
Cyathea strigillosa (Maxon) Domin
Cyathea subincisa (Kunze) Domin
Cyathea subindusiata Domin
Cyathea subtropica Domin
Cyathea sunduei Lehnert
Cyathea suprapilosa Lehnert
Cyathea suprastrigosa (Christ) Maxon
Cyathea surinamensis (Miq.) Domin
Cyathea sylvatica Lehnert
Cyathea tatei S.Maciel, R.Y.Hirai & J.Prado
Cyathea tejedoris Lehnert, F.Giraldo & W.Rodríguez
Cyathea tenera (J.Sm.) Moore
Cyathea tepuiana Christenh.
Cyathea thelypteroides A.R.Sm.
Cyathea thysanolepis (Barrington) A.R.Sm.
Cyathea toroi Lehnert, F.Giraldo & A.Tejedor
Cyathea tortuosa R.C.Moran
Cyathea traillii (Baker) Domin
Cyathea trichomanoides Christenh.
Cyathea tryonorum (Riba) Lellinger
Cyathea tuerckheimii Maxon
Cyathea uleana (A.Samp.) Lehnert
Cyathea universitatis (Vareschi) Christenh.
Cyathea ursina (Maxon) Lellinger
Cyathea valliciergoana A.Tejedor & G.Calat.
Cyathea varians (R.C.Moran) Lehnert
Cyathea vaupensis (P.G.Windisch) Lehnert
Cyathea venezuelensis A.R.Sm. ex Lellinger
Cyathea vilhelmii Domin
Cyathea villosa Humb. & Bonpl. ex Willd.
Cyathea weatherbyana (C.V.Morton) C.V.Morton
Cyathea wendlandii (Mett. ex Kuhn) Domin
Cyathea werffii R.C.Moran
Cyathea whitmeei Baker
Cyathea williamsii (Maxon) Domin
Cyathea windischiana A.R.Sm.
Cyathea xerica A.Tejedor & G.Calat.
Cyathea yambrasensis A.Tejedor & G.Calat.
Cyathea zongoensis Lehnert

Extinct species
 
†Cyathea cranhamii
†Cyathea inequilateralis - Eocene, North American west coast

References

Notes

Bibliography
 Christenhusz, M.J.M. (2009). New combinations and an overview of Cyathea subg. Hymenophyllopsis (Cyatheaceae). Phytotaxa 1: 37–42.
 Large, M.F. and J.E. Braggins (2004). Tree Ferns. Timber Press, Inc. 
 Lehnert, M. (2006). New species and records of tree ferns (Cyatheaceae, Pteridophyta) in the northern Andes. Organisms, Diversity & Evolution 6: 321–322, electronic supplement 13: 1-11.
 Lehnert, M. (2009). Three new species of scaly tree ferns (Cyathea-Cyatheaceae) from the northern Andes. Phytotaxa 2: 43–56.
 The International Plant Names Index

External links
 Cyathea: World Species List
 Alsophila: World Species List
 Sphaeropteris: World Species List
 Smith's original description of the genus online at Project Gutenberg
 Community: Care and propagation of Treeferns (German/English)
 Fern Files: Cyathea

 
Fern genera
Pantropical flora